Knipe may refer to:

Surname:
Alden Knipe, football coach
Humphry Knipe, author
Joseph F. Knipe, brigadier general
Alan Knipe, volleyball coach
Dan Knipe, Founder Of Kilter Finance
Place:
De Knipe, village in Heerenveen in the province Friesland of the Netherlands